The Black Lions were an anti-fascist resistance movement formed to fight against Italy during the occupation of the Ethiopian Empire in the Second World War.

As Bahru Zewde notes, in spite of its "marginal impact on the Resistance" the Black Lions made "eloquent attempts to give the struggle coherent ideological and political direction."

History
The movement was founded in western Ethiopia, and included fighters such as the Shewan Ras Abebe Aregai, and a number of intellectuals who included the sons of Hakim Workneh Eshete and Heruy Welde Sellase, and Yilma Deressa. Its chairman was Alemework Beyene, a veterinary surgeon educated in Britain. The organization had a constitution consisting of ten points, which included: asserting the supremacy of the political sphere over the military, injunctions against mistreating peasants and prisoners of war, forbidding its members from seeking exile and urging them to prefer death to capture by the enemy.

The group was effectively disbanded following the surrender of the Ras Imru Haile Selassie 18 December 1936. The majority of its members were killed by the Italians following the unsuccessful attempt on Rodolfo Graziani's life on 19 February 1937. The few survivors included Alemework and Yilma.

Details
The Black Lions dominated the early resistance movement in Ethiopia.  Members of the Black Lions included students from the Holeta Military Academy and foreign-educated Ethiopians.  The military academy was founded in 1935 and is located in Holeta Genet.

The Black Lions convinced Ras Imru Haile Selassie to join them in the armed struggle since he was part of the dynamics that created the movement.  Ras Imru was appointed by Emperor Haile Selassie as prince regent in his absence.  Ras Imru was to reorganize and continue to resist the Italians.  To do this, he fell back to Gore in southern Ethiopia.  On 19 December 1936, after the Italians pinned him down on the north bank of the Gojeb River, Ras Imru surrendered.  The Black Lions organization then collapsed, and many of its members were murdered.

See also
 Italian East Africa
 Second Italo-Ethiopian War

Footnotes

References

1936 establishments in Ethiopia
1936 disestablishments in Ethiopia
20th century in Ethiopia
African resistance to colonialism
Yekatit 12
National liberation movements
Organizations established in 1936
Organizations disestablished in 1936
Rebel groups in Ethiopia
World War II resistance movements
Anti-fascist organizations